Insulted and Humiliated (German: Erniedrigte und Beleidigte) is a 1922 German silent drama film directed by Frederic Zelnik and starring Lya Mara, Erich Kaiser-Titz and Ralph Arthur Roberts. It is an adaptation of the 1861 novel Humiliated and Insulted by Fyodor Dostoevsky. It premiered at the Marmorhaus in Berlin.

The film's sets were designed by the art director Fritz Lederer.

Cast
Lya Mara
Erich Kaiser-Titz
Ralph Arthur Roberts
Lydia Potechina
Margarete Schön
Anton Edthofer
Fred Goebel
Nikolai Malikoff
Albert Patry
Tatjana Tarydina

References

External links

Films of the Weimar Republic
Films directed by Frederic Zelnik
German silent feature films
German black-and-white films
1922 drama films
German drama films
Films based on works by Fyodor Dostoyevsky
Films based on Russian novels
Silent drama films
1920s German films